Susan Elizabeth Hobson (born 13 March 1958) is a former Australian athlete. She competed at three successive Olympic Games and two Commonwealth Games. She started her competitive athletics career at the age of 27.

She competed in the 10,000 metres at the 1992 and 1996 Olympics and in the marathon at the 2000 Sydney Games. She also represented her country at the 1991 World Athletics Championships in 10,000 metres. She competed at two Commonwealth Games – 10,000m at the Auckland games in 1990 and marathon at the 1994 games in Victoria, British Columbia.

Hobson was Australian champion thrice in the 10,000m (1991–92, 1992–93, 1993–1994), twice in the marathon (1997 and 2000), and once in the cross country (1996).

During her athletics career, she was a scholarship holder with the Australian Institute of Sport, ACT Academy of Sport and West Australian Institute of Sport. Hobson was coached by Pat Clohessy (1988–2000) and Dick Telford (1996–97).

After her athletics career, Hobson was a board member of ACT Athletics and the Athletics Australia Distance Running Commission. She managed the Australian Athletics Teams at the 2009 and 2011 World Championships in Athletics and the 2010 Commonwealth Games. Hobson was section manager of the Australian Athletics Team at the 2012 London Olympics.

Recognition
1993 – Athletics Australia Edwin Flack Award
2007 – Inducted into ACT Sport Hall of Fame
2013 – Life member of Athletics Australia

References

External links
 Susan Hobson at Australian Athletics Historical Results
 
 

1958 births
Living people
People from Queanbeyan
Sportswomen from New South Wales
Australian female long-distance runners
Australian female marathon runners
Olympic athletes of Australia
Athletes (track and field) at the 1992 Summer Olympics
Athletes (track and field) at the 1996 Summer Olympics
Athletes (track and field) at the 2000 Summer Olympics
Commonwealth Games competitors for Australia
Athletes (track and field) at the 1990 Commonwealth Games
Athletes (track and field) at the 1994 Commonwealth Games
World Athletics Championships athletes for Australia
ACT Academy of Sport alumni
Australian Institute of Sport track and field athletes
20th-century Australian women
21st-century Australian women